Conotheca is a genus of Cambrian hyoliths.

References

Cambrian invertebrates
Hyolitha